C-ROSS short for China Risk-Oriented Solvency System is a regulatory framework created by the China Insurance Regulatory Commission that governs the insurance industry in China. It was implemented in 2016.

References

Insurance in China